Air Marshal Sir Harold John Maguire,  (12 April 1912 – 1 February 2001) was a senior Royal Air Force officer and public servant. He was Director-General of Intelligence at the Ministry of Defence from 1968 to 1972.

RAF career
Harold Maguire was born in Kilkishen in County Clare, Ireland. Educated at Wesley College, Dublin and Trinity College Dublin, Maguire joined the Royal Air Force in 1933. He served in the Second World War as officer commanding No. 229 Squadron and then as officer commanding No. 226 Wing based in Sumatra. He was awarded the Distinguished Service Order in 1946 for the gallant example he had set to his fellow captives while he was a prisoner of war during the Japanese invasions of Sumatra and Java in 1942.

After the war Maguire became station commander at RAF Linton-on-Ouse and then group captain, operations at RAF Fighter Command. He was appointed an Officer of the Order of the British Empire and made station commander at RAF Odiham in 1950, became senior air staff officer at AHQ Malta in 1952 and director of tactical and air transport operations in 1956. Appointed a Companion of the Order of the Bath in 1958, he went on to be senior air staff officer at Headquarters No. 11 Group later that year, air officer commanding No. 13 Group in 1959 and air officer commanding No. 11 Group in 1961. After that he was made senior air staff officer at Headquarters Far East Air Force in 1962, Assistant Chief of the Air Staff (Intelligence) in 1964 and Deputy Chief of the Defence Staff (Intelligence) in 1965 before retiring in 1968. He had been knighted as a Knight Commander of the Order of the Bath in 1966.

In 1959 Maguire, by now an air vice-marshal, was forced to land a Spitfire on a cricket pitch in Bromley only 10 minutes after flying over Whitehall in a display commemorating the Battle of Britain. As his engine failed, he spotted the company sports ground of Oxo and managed to put the aircraft down on the square, breaking the stumps at one end while the teams were off having tea.

In retirement Maguire was director-general of intelligence at the Ministry of Defence from 1968 to 1972.

Family
In 1940 he married Mary Elisabeth Wild; they had a son and a daughter.

References

|-

|-

|-

|-

1912 births
2001 deaths
People from County Clare
Alumni of Trinity College Dublin
Knights Commander of the Order of the Bath
Officers of the Order of the British Empire
Companions of the Distinguished Service Order
Royal Air Force air marshals
Royal Air Force personnel of World War II
World War II prisoners of war held by Japan
People educated at Wesley College, Dublin
Heads of RAF Intelligence